Gralla is the Germanized form of the Polish surname Grala. Notable people with the surname include:
Arthur R. Gralla (1913–1998), American sailor
Dina Gralla (1905–1994), German actress
Marcin Gralla (born 1980), Polish skater
Richard Gralla (born 1948), American oncologist

German-language surnames
Surnames of Polish origin
Surnames from nicknames